The 1977 Toronto Argonauts finished in third place in the Eastern Conference with a 6–10 record. They appeared in the Eastern Semi-Final. Richard Holmes became the first player in CFL history to rush for 1,000 yards with two different teams. He rushed for 1016 yards while playing for the Argonauts and the Ottawa Rough Riders.

Offseason

Regular season

Standings

Schedule

Postseason

Awards and honors

References

Toronto Argonauts seasons
1977 Canadian Football League season by team